Ahmed Khan bin Küchük was a Khan of the Great Horde between 1465 and 1481.

Life 
In 1465, Ahmed Khan seized power in the Horde by rising against his brother Mahmud bin Küchük, who had been its ruler since 1459. In 1472, Ahmed Khan entered into alliance with the Polish king Casimir IV against Ivan III of Russia. In 1476, Ahmed Khan suggested to Ivan III that he should recognize him as his overlord.  However the situation of forces was not in the Horde's favour.

In 1480, Ahmed Khan organized another military campaign against Muscovy, which would result in the great stand on the Ugra river, 150 miles from Moscow.  They stood off shouting at one another on opposite banks for weeks before a conflict became inevitable.  Panic set in, as both sides suddenly turned deciding to flee, rather than fight in the tradition of Genghis Khan.  The Horde's retreat meant that the last of the conflict between Eurasians was over.  The Mongols' last possessions were in Kazan, Astrakhan, and the Crimea. Ivan III, Russia's ruler finally freed himself from the Tatar-Mongol dependency.

On 6 January 1481, Ahmed Khan and his men were killed by Siberian Khan, Ibak Khan of Tyumen and Nogays at the mouth of the Donets River.

Personal life
Ahmed Khan's wife was the Timurid princess Badi' al-Jamal, a sister of Sultan Husayn Bayqara of Khorasan. Through this marriage he had two sons, Mahmud Khan and Bahadur Khan, as well as a daughter, Khanzada Khanum. However, Badi' al-Jamal eventually left the Golden Horde and returned with her children to her brother's court in Herat.

Genealogy
Genghis Khan
Jochi
Orda Khan
Sartaqtay
Köchü
Bayan
Sasibuqa
Ilbasan
Chimtay
Urus
Temur-Malik
Temür Qutlugh
Temur ibn Temur Qutlugh
Küchük Muhammad
Ahmed Khan bin Küchük

References

Bibliography 

1481 deaths
Khans of the Golden Horde
15th-century monarchs in Europe
Year of birth unknown